Hopkinsville is a home rule-class city in and the county seat of Christian County, Kentucky, United States. The population at the 2020 census was 31,180.

History

Early years
The area of present-day Hopkinsville was initially claimed in 1796 by Bartholomew Wood as part of a  grant for his service in the American Revolution. He and his wife Martha Ann moved from Jonesborough, Tennessee, first to a cabin near present-day W. Seventh and Bethel streets; then to a second cabin near present-day 9th and Virginia streets; and finally to a third home near 14th and Campbell.

Following the creation of Christian County the same year, the Woods donated  of land and a half interest in their Old Rock Spring to form its seat of government in 1797. By 1798, a log courthouse, jail, and "stray pen" had been built; the next year, John Campbell and Samuel Means laid out the streets for "Christian Court House". The community tried to rename itself "Elizabeth" after the Woods' eldest daughter, but another town in Hardin County preëmpted the name, and the Kentucky Assembly established the town in 1804 as "Hopkinsville" after veteran and state representative Samuel Hopkins of Henderson County (later the namesake of Hopkins County as well and despite being in a neighboring county and having the same namesake, Hopkinsville was never the county seat of Hopkins County, despite Hopkins County being created from Christian and Henderson Counties).

Along with the rest of Kentucky, the town was late in establishing free lower education, but natives organized private schools, and the town was the home of South Kentucky College (est. 1849) and Bethel Female College (est. 1854).

Civil War
The Civil War generated major divisions in Christian County. Confederate support in Hopkinsville and Christian County was evident in the formation of the "Oak Grove Rangers" and the 28th Kentucky Cavalry. Christian County was  the actual birthplace of Jefferson Davis, president of the Confederate States of America, though his birthplace is now part of Todd County, Kentucky.  Several local businessmen and plantation owners contributed money and war supplies to the South. After Confederate forces retreated to Tennessee, however, Camp Joe Anderson was established by the Union to the northwest of Hopkinsville in 1862. Men who trained there became members of the 35th Kentucky Cavalry, the 25th Kentucky Infantry, and the 35th Kentucky Infantry. Gen. James S. Jackson had been a Hopkinsville attorney before the war and was killed in service to the Union at the Battle of Perryville in October 1862. Private citizens who supported the Union cause provided the army with mules, wagons, clothing, and food.

The occupation of Hopkinsville changed at least half a dozen times between the Confederate and Union forces. In December 1864, Confederate troops under Gen. Hylan B. Lyon captured the town and burned down the Christian County courthouse which was being used at that time by the Union army as a barracks. Another skirmish between Union and Confederate forces took place in the field opposite Western State Hospital near the end of the war.

Black Patch tobacco

The Evansville, Henderson, and Nashville Railroad was the first to connect Hopkinsville to surrounding cities in 1868. In 1879, it was purchased by the L&N. The Ohio Valley Railroad (later purchased by the Illinois Southern) reached the city in 1892, as did the Tennessee Central in 1903.

The tobacco from the Black Patch region was highly desired in Europe. In 1904, tobacco planters formed the Dark Tobacco District Planters' Protective Association of Kentucky and Tennessee in opposition to a corporate monopoly by the American Tobacco Company (ATC) owned by James B. Duke. The ATC used their monopoly power to reduce the prices they paid to farmers; the planters' association aimed to organize a boycott of sales to drive the price back up. Many farmers continued to sell independently or secretly, however, prompting the association to form a "Silent Brigade" to pressure such farmers into compliance. With societal pressure seeming to fail, the Silent Brigade (probably under Dr. David A. Amoss) organized the Night Riders (not to be confused with the Ku Klux Klan) to terrorize farmers into submission.

On December 7, 1907, 250 masked Night Riders seized Hopkinsville's police station and cut off all outside contact. They pursued tobacco executives who bought tobacco from farmers who were not members of the Dark Tobacco District Planters' Protective Association and city officials who aided them. Three warehouses were burned, one of whose sites became Peace Park. In April of the next year, a tobacco broker in Paducah named W.B. Kennedy wrote to associates in Rotterdam that "Out of all the mischief that has been done the law has not been able to convict and punish the night-riders. They do their mischief in the night, and wear masks, and they have taken a pledge to never tell anybody anything they know, and for this reason it is impossible to get sufficient evidence to convict them. They have gone on with their mischief making, until they have almost ruined the country."

Tornadoes
On April 2, 2006, an F3 tornado swept through parts of Hopkinsville. In the storm, 200 homes were damaged and 28 people were injured. In addition, structural damage was reported to dozens of other businesses, along with countless trees, power lines, transmission towers and other structures, cutting electricity to the city of Hopkinsville. A gas line was also damaged, causing a gas leak. On January 1, 2022, an EF2 tornado struck Hopkinsville, removing the canopy from a gas station, and destroying the petrol pumps. A church lost parts of its roof, and trees were snapped and some uprooted along the path. This was the first confirmed tornado of 2022.

Geography
Hopkinsville is located south of the center of Christian County at  (36.854712, -87.488872).

Climate 
Hopkinsville has a humid subtropical climate (Köppen Cfa), with hot, humid summers and cool winters.

The data below was accessed via the WRCC and was collected from 1896 until 2018.

Demographics

As of the census of 2010, there were 31,577 people, 12,600 households and 14,318 housing units in the city of Hopkinsville. The racial makeup of the city was 62.6% White, 31.9% African American, 0.4% Native American, 1.1% Asian, 0.1% Pacific Islander, 3.5% from Hispanic or Latino origin, 61.1% White persons not Hispanic (U.S. Census), and 2.5% from two or more races.

There were 12,174 households, out of which 32.4% had children under the age of 18 living with them, 45.1% were married couples living together, 18.2% had a female householder with no husband present, and 33.3% were non-families. 29.7% of all households were made up of individuals, and 12.5% had someone living alone who was 65 years of age or older. The average household size was 2.39 and the average family size was 2.95.

In the city, the population was spread out, with 26.4% under the age of 18, 9.7% from 18 to 24, 28.3% from 25 to 44, 20.8% from 45 to 64, and 14.8% who were 65 years of age or older. The median age was 35 years. For every 100 females, there were 87.9 males. For every 100 females age 18 and over, there were 82.7 males.

The median income for a household in the city was $30,419, and the median income for a family was $37,598. Males had a median income of $30,349 versus $21,259 for females. The per capita income for the city was $15,796. 

The 2020 census estimated the population of Hopkinsville was 30,683 with a median household income of $39,743 and 23% of people living in poverty.

Clarksville MSA
Hopkinsville is part of the Clarksville, TN–KY Metropolitan Statistical Area. Prior to 2003, the area was officially known as the Clarksville-Hopkinsville Metropolitan Statistical Area and included only Montgomery and Christian counties. In 2003, Hopkinsville was removed from the official name as it was no longer considered a principal city. That year, Stewart and Trigg counties were also added to the MSA. The four-county metropolitan area had a population of 232,000 in 2000. A July 1, 2007 estimate placed the population at 261,816. , the Clarksville Metropolitan Statistical Area is the 169th largest MSA in the United States.

Industry
Hopkinsville-Christian County is home to a wide range of businesses and industries, including Fortune 500 companies. Over 50 companies make up the local industrial community. Local industries provide a range of services and manufactured products.

There are nine Japanese companies (wholly owned or joint ventures) in Hopkinsville, as well as one German, Spanish, Canadian and Italian.

The Western State Hospital, established in 1854 as the Western Lunatic Asylum, is an inpatient center for the treatment of mental illness. It is on the National Register of Historic Places. The inpatient population  was 220, from 34 counties in western Kentucky. Its three facilities employed 650 workers in 2004.

Hopkinsville was the headquarters and primary manufacturing facility for Ebonite International, one of the oldest and largest bowling ball manufacturers. Ebonite had a broad market share as they own several well-known brand names including Hammer, Dyno-Thane, Columbia 300, Track, and Robby's. The Hopkinsville plants produced 60 percent of the world's bowling balls before their closing in November 2019 when they were purchased by Brunswick Bowling Products.

Agribusiness
Hopkinsville-Christian County has strong agricultural roots dating back to the settlements in the 1790s. It has been a strong and consistent leader in the production of corn, winter wheat, soybeans, and tobacco.

Statistics released in December 2007, by the Kentucky Department of Agriculture, show Christian County continues to be a leading crop producer. Christian County ranks:
 #1 crops for cash receipts
 #1 winter wheat
 #2 corn
 #3 dark fired tobacco
 #4 soybeans

Other key production includes burley tobacco, alfalfa hay, other hay, cattle, and calves and milk production.

Agriculture has become a highly technical industry, and Christian County farmers realized the need for continuing education and technical training concerning implements, machinery, fertilizers, chemicals, seeds, and overall good farming practice. Because of this progressive attitude, Christian County continues to be an agricultural leader and example of good farming practices. The Hopkinsville Community College has a technical center specializing in agricultural classes. FFA classes at local high schools have over 200 members. The local 4-H group is extremely active serving over a thousand members in a variety of subjects.

The Chamber of Commerce maintains an Agri-Business Committee that promotes "Ag Week". The Agri-Business Committee promotes local agriculture with two events annually with a media blitz via newspaper, radio, and television; one in March during National Agriculture Week and again in July during Christian County Agriculture Week. It honors local farmers in the following four fields: Agri-Business of the Year, Farmer of the Year, Distinguished Service, and Friend of Agriculture. The committee also awards scholarships each year to a student who will pursue an agricultural course in college.

Top employers
According to Hopkinsville's 2020 Comprehensive Annual Financial Report, the top employers in the city were:

Transportation

Road
Hopkinsville is intersected by US 41, US 41A, US 68, US 68 Bypass, and the Interstate 169 (formerly Pennyrile Parkway). A four-lane bypass almost completely circles the city. The Southern portion of the bypass is the route for US 68 Bypass. Congressional funding approved for an extension of the Pennyrile Parkway (now I-169) to Interstate 24 in southern Christian County near Fort Campbell. Construction was completed in three phases. Phase One took the parkway to the US 68 bypass. Phase Two extended it to Lover's Lane. Phase Three, completed in late 2010 but not opened until early 2011, extended the parkway to meet I-24.

Air
All commercial air traffic for residents and visitors to Hopkinsville use Nashville International Airport. Hopkinsville is served by the Hopkinsville-Christian County Airport, a general aviation airport with one  runway.

Rail
Railroad construction and operation in the late 1860s opened markets for agricultural and industrial products. Railroad service was inaugurated in Hopkinsville on April 8, 1868, by the Evansville, Henderson, & Nashville Railroad. This line was later extended north to Henderson and was acquired by the Louisville & Nashville Railroad (now CSX Transportation) in 1879. The Ohio Valley Railroad, purchased by the Illinois Central Railroad (now Illinois Central Gulf) in 1897, was built from Gracey to Hopkinsville in 1892 and abandoned in the 1980s. In 1903, the western division of the Tennessee Central Railway entered Christian County at Edgoten (Edge-of-Tennessee), connecting Clarksville and Hopkinsville. In 1990 the Hopkinsville-Fort Campbell portion was operated by the U.S. Department of Defense.

Media

The Kentucky New Era, founded in 1869, is the daily newspaper for the city and surrounding area.

Hopkinsville is part of the Nashville, Tennessee television designated market area (DMA). From 1983 to 2011, the city had its own local news station, WKAG, initially known in the area as TV-43 then as Source 16.

WHVO radio began broadcasting in Hopkinsville with the call letters WKOA on September 19, 1954, under the license of Pennyrile Broadcasting Company. It was a middle-of-the-road (MOR format) in the 1970s, and then a big band/oldies format during the mid-1980s. The station's callsigns changed to WYKH on August 1, 1986. On December 14, 1987, the station changed its call sign to WQKS. WQKS was acquired by the station's current owner, Ham Broadcasting, in October 1995. The current WHVO callsigns came on May 16, 2000.

The Hoptown Chronicle is a "nonprofit, online news outlet that provides public service journalism from the heart of Hopkinsville."

Attractions and points of interest
Hopkinsville was a stop along the Trail of Tears, and the National Park System's "Trail of Tears Commemorative Park," along 9th Street on the Little River, commemorates this history. Every September, the Trail of Tears Indian Pow-Wow comes to town to Trail of Tears Park. There is a museum and a burial ground, including two important Cherokee leaders who died during the removal – Fly Smith and Whitepath, along with several large osage orange trees in it and dream catchers hanging from the wrought iron fence. There is also a sunken amphitheater. A group of plaques commemorate the great uprooting and journey, and its devastating effect upon the Cherokee people. It is listed in the National Register of Historic Places.

The Pennyroyal Area Museum, located in the old post office building downtown, has exhibits on the history of Hopkinsville and the Pennyrile region. The Pennyroyal Area Museum is owned and funded by the city of Hopkinsville and was established to perpetuate the heritage of southwestern Kentucky's rich history. In 1974, the city of Hopkinsville acquired the old Post Office building from the U.S. government for use as an educational museum. The Pennyroyal Area Museum was established in October 1975, and opened on July 8, 1976. Its board and staff maintain a wide range of activities in its endeavor to preserve and interpret the past. Area citizens have contributed important roles in the Kentucky tradition from the post revolution era to the present. Historical in scope, the museum attempts to portray the development of the nine county Pennyrile region. Exhibits include the night riders of the Black Patch Tobacco Wars; Edgar Cayce, famed local clairvoyant; Jefferson Davis; period room settings; a pioneer bedroom; a miniature circus; antique quilts; black history; historic modes of transportation; as well as historical license plates from Kentucky.

Every May, Hopkinsville hosts Little River Days, a two-day family fun festival featuring road running, canoe racing, a bicycle tour, arts and crafts, food vendors and live entertainment. All activities take place at Merchant Park in downtown Hopkinsville.

The opening text of the horror-comedy film Attack of the Killer Tomatoes notes that Hopkinsville was invaded by millions of black birds in 1975. While damage was caused around Hopkinsville, the birds actually roosted in nearby Fort Campbell.

The city is also known for the Kelly–Hopkinsville encounter, "a series of connected incidents of alleged close encounters with supposed extraterrestrial beings."

Sister city
  Carentan, France (since 2019). A road in Hopkinsville was renamed "Carentan Way".

Education

Public schools
Hopkinsville is part of the Christian County Public Schools system. 

In August 2021, Christian County Public Schools Board voted to consolidate Christian County High School, Hopkinsville High School and two Gateway Academy Campuses into one College & Career Academy High School. The planned opening of the school is the Fall semester of 2024, with Christian County High School and Hopkinsville High School closing the same semester.

Private schools
There are three private schools in Hopkinsville:

 Saints Peter and Paul Catholic School, a Catholic school serving students from preschool through eighth grade.
 University Heights Academy, a college preparatory school serving students from preschool through twelfth grade.
 Heritage Christian Academy, a college preparatory Christian school serving students from preschool through twelfth grade.

Library
Hopkinsville has a lending library, the Hopkinsville-Christian County Public Library.

Hopkinsville Carnegie LibraryThe Hopkinsville Carnegie Library was opened in 1914.  It served the community until 1977, then sat vacant until restoration was begun in 2007.  Currently the restoration is 2/3 complete, and the ground floor is now open and available for rent as an event space.  The exterior has been completely restored.

Climate
The climate in this area is characterized by hot, humid summers and generally mild to cool winters.  According to the Köppen Climate Classification system, Hopkinsville has a humid subtropical climate, abbreviated "Cfa" on climate maps.

Notable residents

Bird Averitt, former NBA and ABA guard
Lane McCray, International recording artist, La Bouche
Ned Breathitt, former governor of Kentucky
Greg Buckner, NBA shooting guard
Harry Buckner, baseball pitcher and outfielder in the Negro leagues
Edgar Cayce (1877–1945), an American Christian mystic and psychic
Jerry Claiborne, former college football coach for the Kentucky Wildcats
Edward M. Coffman, military historian
John Miller Cooper, pioneer of kinesiology
Tony Crunk, children's book author and poet
Logan Feland, United States Marine Corps Major General
Bettiola Heloise Fortson (1890–1917), poet, civil rights activist, suffragist
Steve Gorman, drummer for The Black Crowes
Yvonne Gregory, toured with Glenn Miller Band and art teacher in Hopkinsville schools
Asbury Harpending, financier and adventurer
bell hooks (1952–2021), feminist author and social activist
Larry Jones, thoroughbred racing trainer since 1982, former commercial farmer
Mac King, comedic magician
Margaret Rose Knight (1918-2010), First Lady of North Carolina, 1961-1965
Brice Long, country music artist
Riccardo Martin, operatic tenor
Teresa Medeiros, award-winning romance novelist
Doug Moseley, former member of the Kentucky State Senate; youth pastor at First United Methodist Church in Hopkinsville from 1948 to 1949
Artose Pinner, NFL running back
Christine Johnson Smith, opera singer and Tony Award-nominated Broadway actress
Lynn Starling, screenwriter and playwright
Adlai Stevenson (1835-1914), politician, 23rd vice-president of the United States
Keith Tandy, NFL safety
Thomas R. Underwood, former congressman and U.S. senator
Ed Whitfield, former congressman
Chris Whitney, former NBA point guard
Moe Williams, NFL running back, thoroughbred owner and trainer, (b.1980) 

See also

 Kelly–Hopkinsville encounter, a close encounter which occurred in 1955

References

Further reading
 Glazier, Jack. Been Coming Through Some Hard Times: Race, History, and Memory in Western Kentucky'' (University of Tennessee Press; 2013) 304 pages;  Combines history and ethnography in a study of Hopkinsville

External links
 City of Hopkinsville official website
 "Move to Christian County", Christian County Chamber of Commerce
 Hopkinsville Christian County Economic Development Council
 

 
Cities in Kentucky
Cities in Christian County, Kentucky
County seats in Kentucky
Populated places established in 1796
Clarksville metropolitan area
1804 establishments in Kentucky